Salcedo, officially the Municipality of Salcedo, is a 4th class municipality in the province of Ilocos Sur, Philippines. According to the 2020 census, it has a population of 11,110 people.

Etymology
The town got its name after Juan de Salcedo, a Spanish conquistador.

History
Formerly known as Baugen, it was renamed to Salcedo by virtue of Republic Act No. 1627 after the Spanish conquistador Juan de Salcedo on June 20, 1957.

Geography

Barangays
Salcedo is politically subdivided into 21 barangays. These barangays are headed by elected officials: Barangay Captain, Barangay Council, whose members are called Barangay Councilors. All are elected every three years.

Climate

Demographics

In the 2020 census, Salcedo had a population of 11,110.

Economy 

The people are engaged in farming, producing food crops, mostly rice and tobacco.

Government
Salcedo, belonging to the second congressional district of the province of Ilocos Sur, is governed by a mayor designated as its local chief executive and by a municipal council as its legislative body in accordance with the Local Government Code. The mayor, vice mayor, and the councilors are elected directly by the people through an election which is being held every three years.

Elected officials

See also
List of renamed cities and municipalities in the Philippines

References

External links
Act renaming the municipality of Baugen to Salcedo
Pasyalang Ilocos Sur
Philippine Standard Geographic Code
Philippine Census Information
Local Governance Performance Management System

Municipalities of Ilocos Sur